Turgay Bahadır (born 15 January 1984 in Vienna) is a Turkish-Austrian footballer.

Career 
Bahadir began his career with First Vienna FC and won the youth championship in 1999. He was then scouted from SK Rapid Wien in the summer of 2000. He then left SK Rapid Wien and joined SC Austria Lustenau in the summer of 2003. After sixty games, he scored five goals for SC Austria Lustenau and moved on to join the league rival SC Schwanenstadt from the land of his ancestral estate Turkey in the summer of 2007. He then signed with Kayserispor for two years, playing forty-seven games and scoring four goals. Bahadir then joined Bursaspor in July 2009.

Bursaspor 
With Bursaspor, Bahadır advanced as a football player and fit well with the tactical gameplay of manager Ertuğrul Sağlam. During the entire 2009–2010 Turkish Super League season he usually played as a pivotal striker for Bursaspor, but due to his high technical abilities he was also used as a right winger (MCR) in the absence of Volkan Sen where he performed flawlessly. Bursaspor became the champions in the Turkish Super League 2009–2010 season for the first time in the club's history, whilst Bahadır scored 7 league goals and 3 Ziraat Turkish Cup goals. His most vital goals for Bursaspor in this season were against Trabzonspor in Huseyin Avni Aker Stadium (a high header from penalty area) in a league game and against Denizlispor in Ziraat Turkish Cup; both matches ended with 1–1 draw results.

National team 
He played for Austria U21 and on 15 May 2010, Turkey National Football Team manager Guus Hiddink enlisted Bahadır in the Turkey squad in addition to his fellow Bursaspor teammates Sercan Yıldırım, Volkan Şen and Ozan İpek.

Personal 
Bahadır is a cousin of Cem Tosun and Cemil Tosun and holds a Turkish passport.

Honours 
 Kayserispor
Turkish Cup (1): 2008
 Bursaspor
Süper Lig (1): 2009-10

References

External links
 

1984 births
Living people
Turkish footballers
Turkey international footballers
Turkish expatriate footballers
Turkish expatriate sportspeople in Austria
Expatriate footballers in Austria
Austrian people of Turkish descent
Austrian footballers
Austria under-21 international footballers
SC Austria Lustenau players
Kayserispor footballers
Bursaspor footballers
Süper Lig players
Association football forwards